Châteaurenaud is a former commune in the department of Saône-et-Loire in eastern France. It is a suburb of Louhans and was incorporated into that commune in 1973. The town is sometimes referred to as Louhans-Châteaurenaud.

References

Former communes of Saône-et-Loire